Harvey Scott Barr, Jr. (August 21, 1916 – October 22, 2015) is a former American farmer and politician from Washington, U.S.

Barr was born in Spokane. He served the 7th district in the Washington House of Representatives from 1977 to 1983, and the same district from 1983 to 1993 in the Washington State Senate. The district encompassed Lincoln, Pend Oreille, Stevens, Ferry and parts of Okanogan and Spokane counties. His term ended with his resignation in December 1993. He was a Republican.

He was married to Dollie Mae and was active in farming, cattlemen, and wheat grower organizations. He was a cattle, grain and timber farmer, residing on a farm near Colville, Washington. He died in Colville, Washington on October 22, 2015.

References

1916 births
2015 deaths
Republican Party Washington (state) state senators
Republican Party members of the Washington House of Representatives
Politicians from Spokane, Washington
Farmers from Washington (state)
People from Colville, Washington